Barbarians Led by Bill Gates: Microsoft from the Inside is a book that was jointly written by Jennifer Edstrom and Marlin Eller, an American programmer who was a manager and a software developer at Microsoft Corporation from 1982 to 1995, and development lead for the Graphics Device Interface (GDI) of Windows 1.0 and also for Pen Windows. Written as a third-person account of Eller's experiences at Microsoft, it goes into detail about the early years of Microsoft and its emergence as a massive corporation.

Two chapters of the book deal specifically with the business contacts between Microsoft and GO Corporation. In April 2008, as part of a larger federal court case,  the gesture features of the Windows/Tablet PC operating system and hardware were found to infringe on a patent by GO Corp. concerning gesture interfaces in operating systems for portable computers.

References

External links
 The first chapter of Barbarians Led by Bill Gates at washingtonpost.com

1998 non-fiction books
Books about computer and internet entrepreneurs
History of Microsoft